Yakhyeon Catholic Church (약현성당) is historic church of the Jungnim-dong, Jung District, Seoul. The parish is a part of the Archdiocese of Seoul. The official name is church of St. Joseph.

History
The church was established in 1892 by the French Catholic missionary Fr. Eugene Jean Georges Coste of the Society of Foreign Missions of Paris, as a result of Korea gaining religious freedom in 1886.

It was the first Catholic church to be established in the city, and it was the first Gothic-style church in Korea.

The building is registered as an Historic Site of South Korea, number 252, designated in 1977. The building measures 12 by 32 meters and the bell tower is 26 meters tall. The structure was damaged by an arson attack in 1998 and was restored in 1999.

References

External links

 Yakhyeon Catholic Church Official Website (Korean)

Jung District, Seoul
Churches in Seoul
Roman Catholic churches completed in 1892
19th-century Roman Catholic church buildings in South Korea
1892 establishments in Korea